Cyberflashing is a crime which involves sending obscene pictures to strangers online, often done through AirDrop. The term can also apply to the same action carried out entirely through Bluetooth and other online services.

Initial usage

The first mainstream coinage of the term occurred around 13 August 2015, after a female commuter was AirDropped two pictures of a penis. The case was reported to the British Transport Police who indicated that as the pictures were declined, insufficient data was recorded by the receiving phone and could not provide suitable evidence.

Methodology and prevention

AirDrop is a hybrid communication method of Bluetooth and Wi-Fi. Bluetooth passes communication via use of UHF radio waves. AirDrop seeks out potential communication partners by use of Bluetooth and then uses it to establish a secure peer-to-peer "Wi-Fi channel" over which the actual information is passed—usually photographs, documents, and videos.

An appropriately equipped device can seek out any active peers within about 10 meters. The harassing individual can make an initial connection with any device that is open to all users. A photo can then be sent with a preview of the photo being shown to the device's owner at the same time as a request to allow the connection. Therefore, the harassment (the "flashing") can occur before a specific connection is authorized.

Prevention requires reverting to the iPhone's default conditions - either turn AirDrop off or set it only to allow connections with contacts. Police forces have suggested pushing AirDrop to program an automatic reversion to this condition after a set time of configured open access.

If harassing photographs are received, then keeping them allows the victim to provide a much greater set of information to cybercrime units with the police. However, this does cause the issue that the most effective methods of catching the cyber-flashers risk causing additional harassment and pain to the victims.

Additional incidents

The frequency of the crime has been difficult to assess with significantly stronger anecdotal evidence than indicated by crime figures. 

On August 13, 2017, the New York Post reported that at least two women were sent nude pictures while commuting. A HuffPost reporter in the UK was also sent more than 100 sexual pictures while commuting. This case was reported to the British Transport Police, and when these news stories were published, several women indicated to the publications that they had suffered similar harassment. However, UK police forces indicate very few complaints about these actions despite "a growing awareness" of it occurring. This indicates a wide level of under-reporting and thus few arrests and prosecutions.

In Australia, May 2018, it was reported that cyber-flashing was increasingly common as a prank used by children, popular due to its ease in targeting multiple individuals very rapidly in a fairly unidentifiable fashion.

In Israel, May 2022, an AnadoluJet flight aborted its takeoff at Ben Gurion Airport after pictures of airplane crashes were distributed among passengers via AirDrop.

Legal issues

As with other technological-based abuses, such as Deepfake pornography, revenge porn, and upskirting, there was no specific pre-existing law designed to criminalize and prevent cyber-flashing. This means that many police forces were and are required to fall back on more generalized crimes such as harassment and outraging public decency. 

In New South Wales, Australia, The Crimes Amendment (Intimate Images) Bill 2017 was implemented to make it an offense to "intentionally record or distribute, or threaten to record or distribute, an intimate image of a person without their consent". This legislation would cover cyber-flashing by its prohibition on distributing intimate images without consent.

In the UK there has been criticism that "upskirting laws" under consideration would not cover cyber-flashing, as well as other forms of image-based abuse, such as revenge porn. The proposed laws also have a stronger intent prohibition, and it is unclear whether it would cover non-harassment circumstances as well as issues where the receiver of the images has not consented but the "image subject" has. 

In Singapore, cyberflashing, upskirt photography, and revenge porn have been criminalized since May 2019.

On 13 March 2022, the UK Government announced cyberflashing would be criminalised with perpetrators facing up to two years behind bars under new laws applying to England and Wales.. Cyber flashing has been illegal in Scotland since 2010.

See also 

 Dick pic
 Exhibitionism
 Harassment
 Sexting

References

Cybercrime
Sexual slang
Sexual abuse
Sexual harassment
Sex crimes